Pedro Emiliano Múñoz Zúñiga (born 9 June 1986) is a Chilean football striker currently playing in Universidad de Concepción.

Muñoz began his professional playing career in 2006 with Curico Unido, he played for Cobresal in 2008 before returning to Curico. He joined Universidad de Concepción in 2009.

Club statistics

External links
 BDFA profile

1986 births
Living people
Chilean footballers
Chilean Primera División players
Cobresal footballers
Curicó Unido footballers
Universidad de Concepción footballers
Association football forwards